Elijah Thurmon (born August 2, 1978) is a former American Football wide receiver who played in the National Football League, and the Canadian Football League.  He entered the NFL as a free agent with the Philadelphia Eagles. Thurmon played college football for Howard University, and was inducted into their hall of fame in 2016.

Early years
Thurmon attended Meade High School where he played football, basketball and track.

At Howard University Thurmon earned NCAA Academic All American, the Howard University Excellence Award, and MEAC Academic Honors. He was also a recognized as a Unanimous All American as he broke Howard and MEAC total pass receiving yards and pass receptions records.

Professional career

National Football League
Considered one of the best wide receivers in the MEAC while at Howard University, Thurmon was acquired as a free agent by the NFL's Philadelphia Eagles. The following season, he signed with the Oakland Raiders and in the 2003 season, the Chicago Bears signed him and allocated him to NFL Europe's Berlin Thunder where he started ten games as wide receiver, leading the team with 37 receptions for 412 yards and five touchdowns.

Canadian Football League
After his years in the NFL, Thurmon joined the CFL Saskatchewan Roughriders in 2004 as a free agent He had 88 receptions as slotback in 2005 for 1,048 yards and seven touchdowns, and was chosen as a West Division All-Star.

Thurmon became a free agent and signed with the Calgary Stampeders in 2006.

The Montreal Alouettes signed Thurmon in 2007 and he was named their offence MVP for four of the season's 18 games.

After professional football
Thurmon was inducted into the Howard University Hall of Fame in 2016.

References

External links
Stats Crew profile

1978 births
Living people
African-American players of Canadian football
Berlin Thunder players
Calgary Stampeders players
Canadian football slotbacks
Canadian football wide receivers
Howard University alumni
Montreal Alouettes players
People from Anne Arundel County, Maryland
Saskatchewan Roughriders players
Sportspeople from Heidelberg
21st-century African-American sportspeople
20th-century African-American sportspeople